The North River Game Land is a North Carolina state game land located north of the Albemarle Sound, in Camden and Currituck counties in the state of North Carolina, United States.

External links
Map from the North Carolina Wildlife Resources Commission
Description page from the Nature Conservancy

Protected areas of North Carolina
Protected areas of Camden County, North Carolina
Protected areas of Currituck County, North Carolina